St. Joseph's Higher Secondary School is a boys' school located in the scenic hill station town Ooty, which is part of The Nilgiris district in Tamil Nadu, India. The school was started by Christian missionaries in 1820.

Location
The school is incorporated in the locale of St. Mary's Hill in the town, at a distance of about one kilometer from Ooty bus stand and Railway station. The location of the school enables student access from even remote rural parts of the district. The school is considered to be located in an environment ideal for students' education as the surroundings are quiet and free from noise pollution.

Activities
The school takes part in sporting activities like cricket, handball, football etc. Cultural activities organized in the school includes Teachers day celebrations and an Annual Sports Meet. In 2010, the school conducted the 70th Annual Sports Meet. The school also engages in other activities like organizing the annual dog show in the school ground.

Facilities
The school offers institutional transport facilities for its students of the school in the form of buses. This transport facility is extended to students from both urban and rural areas surrounding Ooty.

See also

 St. Joseph's Boys School, Coonoor
St. Joseph's Higher Secondary School, Sulthan Bathery
 Breeks Memorial School, Ooty
 Hebron School, Ooty
 The Laidlaw Memorial School and Junior College, Ketti, Ooty
 Lawrence School, Lovedale, Ooty
 Woodside School, Ooty
 Stanes Hr.Sec. School, Coonoor
 Good Shepherd International School, Ooty

References

Boys' schools in India
Christian schools in Tamil Nadu
High schools and secondary schools in Tamil Nadu
Schools in Nilgiris district
Education in Ooty
Educational institutions established in 1820
1820 establishments in India